The Red Devils are the Parachute Regiment's parachute display team. The team wears the distinctive maroon beret. The Red Devils are regular serving paratroopers from the four battalions of the Parachute Regiment who have volunteered to serve on the display team.

History
During the summer of 1963 Lt Edward Gardener, Major John Weeks and Corporal Sherdy Vatnsdal discussed the prospects of forming a full-time Regimental display team. Lt Gardener wrote a paper on this subject which eventually led to the Regimental Colonel, Glyn Gilbert (the newly appointed APA chairman) giving the venture his full support. On 1 January 1964 Edward Gardener assumed the appointment of Officer Commanding the Parachute Regiment Free Fall Display Team (the name Red Devils came later) with a small office in Regimental Headquarters in Maida Barracks Aldershot. Problems were encountered in recruiting a team, gaining equipment and obtaining display bookings, all three Battalions provided differing levels (due to operational commitments) of manning and a 17-man team was formed. The provision of parachutes and other personal equipment was regrettably a simple problem. There were no funds available and no one was prepared to sponsor an unknown quantity. Team members therefore had to purchase their own kit! Jump platforms were provided by hiring the APA's Rapide or other civilian aircraft (again team members had to meet the costs) until Lt Col Gilbert came up with the unprecedented idea that the team needed their own Rapide. Funds were gathered as interest free loans from the three Battalions and by mid-June the team had purchased their own fully overhauled aircraft brought back from Beirut. This original Rapide was named "VALKYRIE"

The aircraft was flown then, as now by volunteer civilian and military pilots, with the assistance of Major Peter Cockroft of RHQ Para. Around 50 displays were booked between May and October 1964 of which around thirty were completed. All fees went towards paying the aircraft purchase loans but by the end of 1964 the free fall team were well and truly established.

The distinctive maroon beret of the Parachute Regiment was first worn by the men of the Regiment when it went into action in North Africa in November 1942.

On 22 July 2022, two Red Devils team members broke the Guinness World Record for the largest flag down-planed; which measured 450 square metres.

Notable members of the Red Devils 
 Charles "Nish" Bruce (1978-1982).
 Marshall ("Aussie") Power, an Australian distinguished parachutist who was later a member of the Australian Special Air Service Regiment

References

External links

History of The Parachute Regiment Free Fall Team
The Red Devils online

1964 establishments in the United Kingdom
Airborne units and formations
Military history of Wiltshire
Military parachuting in the United Kingdom
Military units and formations established in 1964
Organisations based in Wiltshire
Parachute display teams
Parachute Regiment (United Kingdom)
Nicknames of military personnel